Heavyweight boxers Muhammad Ali and Al Lewis fought on July 19, 1972, in Dublin, Ireland. Ali won the bout through a technical knockout in the 11th round.

A 2012 documentary called When Ali Came to Ireland presents the story of Ali's visit.

References

Lewis
1972 in boxing
July 1972 sports events in Europe